The 1984 Japan Open Tennis Championships  was a tennis tournament played on outdoor hard courts in Tokyo, Japan that was part of the 1984 Volvo Grand Prix and the 1984 Virginia Slims World Championship Series. The tournament was held from 8 October through 14 October 1984. David Pate and Lilian Drescher won the singles titles.

Finals

Men's singles
 David Pate defeated  Terry Moor 6–3, 7–5
It was Pate's 1st singles title of his career.

Women's singles
 Lilian Drescher defeated  Shawn Foltz 6–4, 6–2
 It was Drescher' only career title.

Men's doubles
 David Dowlen /  Nduka Odizor defeated  Mark Dickson /  Steve Meister 6–7, 6–4, 6–3
It was Dowlen's 2nd title of the year and the 3rd of his career. It was Odizor's 2nd title of the year and the 5th of her career.

Women's doubles
 Betsy Nagelsen /  Candy Reynolds defeated  Emilse Raponi-Longo /  Adriana Villagrán-Reami 6–3, 6–2 
 It was Nagelsen's 3rd title of the year and the 14th of her career. It was Reynolds' 3rd title of the year and the 20th of her career.

References

External links
 Official website
  Association of Tennis Professionals (ATP) tournament profile

Japan Open
Japan Open
Japan Open Tennis Championships
Japan Open Tennis Championships
Japan Open (tennis)